Oltenești is a commune in Vaslui County, Western Moldavia, Romania. It is composed of six villages: Curteni, Oltenești, Pâhna, Târzii, Vinețești and Zgura.

References

Communes in Vaslui County
Localities in Western Moldavia